Eleonora Zouganeli (born 1 February 1983), is a Greek singer.

Biography
Zouganeli was born in 1983 in Athens and is the daughter of Giannis Zouganelis and Isidora Sideris. From a very young age she was involved as an actress in children's theatrical performances and as a singer in children's songs.

Discography

 Ela (2008)
 Exodos 2 (2010)
 Ipa Stous Filous Mou (2011)
 Metakomisi Tora (2013)
 Na Me Thimase Ke Na M' Agapas - Ta Tragoudia Tis Melinas (2014)
 M' Agapouses Ki Anthize (2015)
 Pou Me Ftasane Oi Erotes (2018)
 Parto Allios (2021)

Filmography
In 2014 Zouganeli participated as a guest star in the movie "Apo Erota..." written and directed by Theodoris Atheridis.

In 2015 she embodied French singer Edith Piaf in a musical that went on the Stage Kotopouli Rex at the National Theatre of Greece.

In 2017 she participated in Alexis Kardaras' emotional music film entitled Fantasia.

From 2019-2020 television season is on the jury of the talent show The Voice of Greece.

Awards and nominations

Life & Style Woman of the Year

MAD Video Music Awards

Super Music Awards 2021

References

1983 births
21st-century Greek women singers
Living people
Singers from Athens